The Mongolia Telecom Company (MTC) was created in 1992 after the Ministry of Communications in the Communist era was restructured and phone services were privatized. The majority of shares in the company are still held by the state, 40% are owned by KT (formerly Korea Telecom), and 5.56% are publicly traded. MTC is the predecessor to Information Communications Network LLC, commonly known as NetCo.

Telecommunications companies of Mongolia

References